Fiona Kerr Paisley  (born 1958) is a Scottish-born Australian cultural historian at Griffith University. Her research and writing focuses on Australian Indigenous, feminist and transnational history.

Paisley was born in Aberdeen, Scotland in 1958. During her childhood she moved with her family between Scotland and Australia. She settled in Melbourne where she completed a BA and DipEd at Monash University and then worked as a high school teacher, before studying for a MEd at the University of Melbourne. She then undertook a PhD at La Trobe University, successfully submitting her thesis, "Ideas Have Wings: White Women Challenge Aboriginal Policy 1920-1937", which was supervised by Marilyn Lake.

Honours and recognition 
Paisley won the 2014 Magarey Medal for Biography for The Lone Protestor.

She was elected Fellow of the Academy of the Social Sciences in Australia in 2016 and of the Australian Academy of the Humanities in 2018.

Selected works

References

External links 

 The story of AM Fernando — Fiona Paisley talks to Phillip Adams about her book

1958 births
Living people
Monash University alumni
University of Melbourne alumni
La Trobe University alumni
Academic staff of Griffith University
Australian women historians
Fellows of the Academy of the Social Sciences in Australia
Fellows of the Australian Academy of the Humanities